Royal Air Force Fullarton or more simply RAF Fullarton is a former Royal Air Force Ground Control Intercept station, situated in Ayrshire, Scotland.

History

RAF Fullarton was established during the Second World War and initially consisted of mobile vans, but was later upgraded to a stage 2 station with operations blocks made out of brick. The station was never fully updated and remained an intermediate station.  The station closed at the end of the war and was placed on care and maintenance until the early 1950s when the site was selected for the ROTOR programme, as RAF Gailes.

References

Royal Air Force stations in Scotland